Sipahi were professional cavalrymen deployed by the Seljuks, and later the Ottoman Empire, including the land grant-holding (timar) provincial timarli sipahi, which constituted most of the army, and the salaried regular kapikulu sipahi, or palace troops. However, the irregular light cavalry  ("raiders") were not considered to be . The sipahi formed their own distinctive social classes and were rivals to the Janissaries, the elite infantry corps of the Sultan.

It was also the title given to several cavalry units serving in the French and Italian colonial armies during the 19th and 20th centuries (see ).

Name
The Portuguese version is also sipaio (with variants like sipai, cipaio and cipai), but in Spanish it was adapted as cipayo. The word sepoy is derived from the same Persian word . In Maldivian, the army's soldiers are referred to as {ސިފައިން} "sifain".

Description

The term refers to all freeborn Ottoman Turkish mounted troops other than akıncı and tribal horsemen in the Ottoman army. The word was used almost synonymously with cavalry. The sipahis formed two distinct types of cavalry: feudal-like, provincial  (timariots) which consisted most of the Ottoman army, and salaried, regular  (sipahi of the Porte), which constituted the cavalry part of the Ottoman household troops.

The provincial governors, or beys, were rotated every few years, preventing land inheritance.  The provinces, or sanjaks, were not all equal since Anatolia and the Balkans were mostly ruled by Turks, while other areas of the empire were more flexible, adhering, somewhat, to local traditions.

The entwinement of land, military, politics, economics and religion was a way of life.
The timar system, where the sultan owned all land but individual plots of land, came with residential rights. The Ottoman people had rights to the land but the sipahi, a unique kind of military aristocracy and cavalry portion of the military, also lived on the land with the farmers (90% of the population) and collected tax revenues, usually in-kind, to subsidize the costs of training and equipping the small army, dedicated to serving the sultan. The sipahi did not inherit anything, preventing power centres from growing and threatening the supreme power structure. The locals on the timar used the land and all it produced.

Timarli Sipahis

Status

The "Timarli Sipahi" or "timariot" (tımarlı) was the holder of a fief of land granted directly by the Ottoman sultan or with his official permission by beylerbeys. He was entitled to all of the income from that land, in return for military service. The peasants on the land were subsequently attached thereto. Timarli Sipahis' status resembled that of the knights of medieval Europe. Unlike medieval knights, they were not legally owners of their fiefs. The right to govern and collect taxes in a timar fief was merely given to a Timarli Sipahi by the Ottoman State. And in return, tımarli sipahis were responsible for security of the people in their timar, enlisting and training cebelu soldiers for the army.

A timar was the smallest unit of land held by a Sipahi, providing a yearly revenue of no more than 20,000 , which was between two and four times what a teacher earned. A  was a larger unit of land, yielding up to 100,000 akçe, and was owned by Sipahis of officer rank. A has was the largest unit of land, giving revenues of more than 100,000 akçe, and was only held by the highest-ranking members of the military. A tîmâr Sipahi was obliged to provide the army with up to five armed retainers, a ziamet Sipahi with up to twenty, and a has Sipahi with far more than twenty. The cebelu (meaning "armed, armored") were expected to be mounted and fully equipped as the sipahi themselves; they were usually sons, brothers or nephews and their position was probably more similar to squires than men-at-arms.

Although timars were not originally granted to their holders until perpetuity (the state inheriting the land at the death of the landholder), but by the end of the 17th century the estates were passed on from father to son.

Military

In wartime, Timarli sipahis and their retainers were gathered under their  (regiment) beys. Alay-beys were gathered with their troops under sanjak (province) beys, and sanjak-beys gathered under beylerbeys. If a battle was to be fought in Europe, Rumeli (Balkan) Sipahis took the honorary right flank under the Rumeli beylerbey, while the Anatolian beylerbey and his Sipahis took the left flank; when a battle was in Asia, positions were switched. This way, the Ottoman classical army's flanks wholly consisted of Timariot cavalry, while the center consisted of Janissary infantry and artillery divisions.

The equipment and tactics differed between the Anatolian and Balkan Timarli Sipahi. The Anatolian Sipahi were equipped and fought as classic horse archers, shooting while galloping, yet they were not nomadic cavalry and their status was similar to medium cavalry class. Balkan Timarli Sipahis wore chainmail, rode barded horses and carried lances and javelins, and fought as medium cavalry.

Timarli Sipahis of the classical Ottoman period usually comprised the bulk of the army and did the majority of the fighting on the battlefield. While infantry troops at the army's center maintained a static battle line, the cavalry flanks constituted its mobile striking arm. During battle, Timarli Sipahi tactics were used, opening the conflict with skirmishes and localized skirmishes with enemy cavalry. Regiments of Timarli Sipahis made charges against weaker or isolated units and retreated back to the main body of troops whenever confronted with heavy cavalry. During one regiment's retreat, other regiments of sipahis may have charged the chasing enemy's flanks. Such tactics served to draw enemy cavalry away from infantry support, break their cohesion, and isolate and overwhelm them with numerical superiority. Anatolian Sipahis had the ability to harass and provoke opposing troops with arrow shots. More heavily equipped Balkan Sipahis carried javelins for protection against enemy horsemen during their tactical retreats. All cavalry flanks of the Ottoman army fought a fluid, mounted type of warfare around the center of the army, which served as a stable pivot.

The standard equipment of Rumeli Sipahis of the classical Ottoman period consisted of a round shield, lance, sword, javelins, and plated armour. Their horses were barded. Standard equipment of Anatolian Sipahis in the same era was a round shield, composite Turkish bow, arrows, kilij (Turkish sword), and leather or felt armor. Anatolian Sipahis sometimes also carried lances.

Kapikulu Sipahis 

Kapikulu Sipahis (Sipahis of the Porte), also known as the Six Divisions of Cavalry, were household cavalry troops of the Ottoman Palace. They were the cavalry equivalent of the Janissary household infantry force. There were six divisions of Kapikulu Sipahis: Sipahis, Silahtars, Right Ulufecis, Left Ulufecis, Right Garips, and Left Garips. All of them were paid quarterly salaries, while the Sipahis and Silahtars were elite units.

 ("weapon masters") were chosen from the best warriors in the Ottoman Empire. Any Ottoman soldier who committed a significant deed on the battlefield could be promoted to the Silahtar division, although normally members of other mounted units, like Timarli Sipahis or one of the other less prestigious of the four divisions of Kapikulu Sipahis, were promoted this way. Infantry soldiers had to enlist as serdengecti (literally means giver of his head) and survive suicide missions to join Silahtar division. If a janissary ever became a silahtar, other members of the division with cavalry backgrounds despised him and former comrade janissaries considered him a traitor, but because the position and wealth of a silahtar was so attractive, Janissaries and other soldiers still enlisted for suicide missions.

The commander of the Silahtar division was the Silahtar Agha. He was the official weaponsmaster of the palace and a close personal aide of the sultan, helping him to don his armor. He was also a liaison officer who supervised the communication between the sultan and the grand vizier.

The Sipahi division was the most prestigious of the six divisions. Traditionally, sons of Ottoman élite (sons of Vezirs, Pashas and Beys) served in this unit. The Sipahis and Silahtars were granted timar fiefs near Istanbul, alongside their salaries. Ulufeci means "salaried ones", and the members of two Ulufeci divisions weren't granted timar fiefs. Garip means "poor ones" (because their equipment was lighter compared to the other four divisions) and were paid salaries.

The six divisions of Sipahis represented the Kapikulu cavalry in the same way that the Janissaries represented the Kapikulu infantry. Kapikulu means servant of the Porte. Servants of the Porte (Kapikullari) were legally servants of the Ottoman throne. They weren't literally slaves, though their legal status was different from other Ottoman people. The Sultan had the power to directly command execution of his servants without any court verdict. Theoretically, the Sultan didn't have this kind of power over other people, even simple peasants.

Equipment of Silahtar, Sipahi and Ulufeci divisions was plated mail, chainmail, round shield, sword, composite bow, arrows, lance, bozdogan mace and axe. Their equipment was similar to Rumeli (Balkan) provincial Timarli Sipahis, though they wore brilliant fabrics, prominent hats and bore ornamented polearms. The two Garip divisions were more lightly equipped.

In the classical period Ottoman battle formation, Kapikulu Sipahis were positioned back of the army as rearguards. They acted as reserve cavalry and bodyguards of Ottoman sultan and viziers. Their job included to join and reinforce Ottoman army's flanks which otherwise consisted entirely provincial timariot sipahis.

The Sipahis of the Porte (Kapikulu Sipahis) were founded during the reign of Murad I. The Sipahi eventually became the largest of the six divisions of the Ottoman cavalry. Their duties included mounted body-guarding for the sultan and his family, as well as parade-riding with the sultan, having replaced the earlier Silahtar division for this duty.

Rivalry with the Janissary corps 

Since Kapikulu Sipahis were a cavalry regiment, it was well known within the Ottoman military circles that they considered themselves a superior stock of soldiers than Janissaries, who were sons of Christian peasants from the Balkans (Rumelia), and were officially slaves bounded by various laws of the devşirme.

They made great strides of efforts to gain respect within the Ottoman Empire and their political reputation depended on the mistakes of the Janissary. That minor quarrels erupted between the two units is made evident with a Turkmen adage, still used today within Turkey, "", which, referring to the unruly Janissaries, translates into "Horsemen don't mutiny".

Towards the middle of the 16th century, the Janissaries had started to gain more importance in the army, though the Sipahis remained an important factor in the empire's bureaucracy, economy and politics, and a crucial aspect of disciplined leadership within the army. As late as the 17th century, the Sipahis were, together with their rivals the Janissaries, the de facto rulers in the early years of sultan Murad IV's reign. In 1826, after an evident Janissary revolt the Sipahis played an important part in the disbandment of the Janissary corps. The Sultan received critical assistance from the loyalist Sipahi cavalry in order to forcefully dismiss the infuriated Janissaries.

Two years later, however, they shared a similar fate when Sultan Mahmud II revoked their privileges and dismissed them in favor of a more modern military structure. Unlike the Janissaries before them they retired honorably, peacefully, and without bloodshed into new Ottoman cavalry divisions who followed modern military tradition doctrines. Older sipahis were allowed to retire and keep their tımar lands until they died, and younger sipahis joined the Asakir-i Mansure-i Muhammediye army as cavalry.

Notable individuals
 Ulubatlı Hasan (1428–1453), Timariot
 Yakup Ağa, father of Hayreddin Barbarossa

In popular culture
Video games
 Sipahis appear in The Creative Assembly's Empire: Total War as a heavy cavalry unit employed by the Ottoman Empire and other Islamic factions. They also are employed by the Hindu Marathas. Also in Napoleon: Total War to the Ottomans as the second greatest lancer unit. Second to another Ottoman unit, the Silahtar Guard.
 Sipahis appear in Ensemble Studio's Age of Empires III as a heavy cavalry unit unique to the Ottoman Empire.
 Sipahis are employed by the Turks in Medieval II Total War in three different forms: Sipahis, mounted archers; Sipahi Lancers, heavy cavalry, and Dismounted Sipahi Lancers, heavy infantry.
 Sipah is cavalry unit unique to Turkey in Cossacks: European Wars series computer games developed by GSC Game World.
 The Sipahi is the unique unit for the Ottoman Empire in the computer games Civilization III and Civilization V (where the game itself was made by Firaxis), the other unique unit is Janissary.
 In the video game Assassin's Creed: Revelations, the player can obtain a set of "Sepahi Riding Armor" for the protagonist.
Other
 In the historical novel Eight Pointed Cross (2011) by Marthese Fenech, the character Timurhan is a prominent Sipahi in the Ottoman imperial cavalry
 In the book The Count of Monte Cristo by Alexandre Dumas one of the characters sells himself into the service of the Spahis in North Africa.
 The title character of the film "Lady Killer", played by Jean Gabin, is a Spahi.

See also

 Italian Spahis

Notes

References

External links
Turkish Sipahis

Cavalry units and formations of the Ottoman Empire
Turkish words and phrases
Cavalry